David Tan is a Singaporean law professor at the National University of Singapore Faculty of Law. He was the Vice Dean of Academic Affairs from January 2015 to June 2021. His legal scholarship covers intellectual and intangible property law. He is also a fine art and fashion photographer, with exhibitions presented by Cartier and Versace.

Biography

David graduated with a Bachelor of Laws (First Class Honours) and a Bachelor of Commerce from the University of Melbourne, and he was a resident of Trinity College, Melbourne (1991–1995) where he was named Valedictorian. He was awarded the RJ Hamer and Corrs Chambers Westgarth Prizes in Constitutional & Administrative Law, Price Waterhouse Prize in Contracts, and Rayne Dickson Memorial Exhibition Prize in Health & Medical Law. David was conferred a Master of Laws in 1999 from Harvard, where he attended on the Lee Kuan Yew Scholarship.

David worked in DBS Bank before joining the Singapore Administrative Service in December 2001, serving as director of International Talent at the Ministry of Manpower and head of Contact Singapore, and as Director of Sports in the Ministry of Community Development, Youth and Sports. David left the Singapore Administrative Service and enrolled in the Ph.D. programme at Melbourne Law School in 2006. He received the Oakleaf Award from Trinity College at the University of Melbourne for "his services to the arts, law and education". The Oakleaf Award commemorates 150 years of Trinity College by recognising living alumni and supporters who have made a notable contribution to Trinity, the broader community, or both, within Australia or globally.

David joined NUS Law as an assistant professor in December 2008. In 2012, he became a tenured associate professor. He was appointed vice dean of academic affairs in 2015, overseeing the LL.B. and LL.M. programmes. In 2016, he was appointed to the position of dean's chair at the faculty. He was promoted to full professor on 1 July 2018.

David has a curatorial collection of over 200 jackets, mainly blazers, which includes rare runway looks from Alexander Lee McQueen's final menswear collection and Gucci's "Roger Federer Met Gala 2017" crystal cobra tuxedo. In 2022, the National Museum of Singapore acquired some of his jackets as part of the museum’s ongoing documentation of contemporary styles and perspectives in Singapore.

Legal scholarship

David's legal scholarship covers three areas of intellectual and intangible property – personality rights, copyright, and trademarks – as well as tort law and comparative constitutional freedom of expression. He adopts an "interdisciplinary approach drawing on cultural studies and semiotics".

His monograph The Commercial Appropriation of Fame: A Cultural Analysis of the Right of Publicity and Passing Off was published by Cambridge University Press in 2017. David has also published in a range of journals including Yale Journal of International Law, Harvard Journal of Sports & Entertainment Law, Fordham Intellectual Property, Media & Entertainment Law Journal, Virginia Sports & Entertainment Law Journal, WIPO Journal, Sydney Law Review and Law Quarterly Review.

David's recent work also encompasses the future of legal education in Singapore. He has proposed a new "3T" paradigm of "Transnationalism, Technology and Tradition".

Photography

David has contributed to magazines like Harper’s Bazaar and Elle. He is currently represented by Yang Gallery. A visual arts studio at Trinity College, Melbourne has been named after him. In 2022, he reimagined Adrian Pang and Kit Chan as Lee Kuan Yew and Kwa Geok Choo based on vintage photographs in the principal photography for The LKY Musical staged by the Singapore Repertory Theatre.

David has staged several solo photography exhibitions:

 "Multiculturalism or Monoculturalism" (1997)
 "Private Moments" (1999)
 "Visions of Beauty" featuring the designs of Versace (2000)
 "Tainted Perfection" presented by Cartier (2003)
 "The First Decade: 1996-2005" (2005) 
 "7 Rules" presented by 7 For All Mankind (2010)
 "Double Exposure" presented by Yang Gallery (2019) (with Billy Mork)

References

External links
 NUS Staff Profile
 MLS Staff Profile

Living people
Academic staff of the National University of Singapore Faculty of Law
20th-century Singaporean lawyers
Singaporean photographers
Melbourne Law School alumni
Harvard Law School alumni
1969 births
21st-century Singaporean lawyers